Max Planck Institutes are research institutions operated by the Max Planck Society. There are over 80 institutes. Most of them are located in Germany, although there are other locations in other European countries and the United States.

Institutes are organized into five sections according to their research area:
 Astronomy & Astrophysics
 Biology & Medicine
 Material & Technology
 Environment & Climate
 Humanities

One institute can belong to several research areas. In addition, it can also belong to several more specialized research fields.

Institutes and Research Units 
As of December 2020, the following Max Planck Institutes and Research Units exist (in alphabetical order):

Former 
 Max Planck Institute for Biophysical Chemistry (merged with the Max Planck Institute for Experimental Medicine to form the Max Planck Institute for Multidisciplinary Sciences)
 Max Planck Institute for Experimental Medicine (merged with the Max Planck Institute for Biophysical Chemistry to form the Max Planck Institute for Multidisciplinary Sciences)
 Max Planck Institute of Neurobiology (merged with the Max Planck Institute for Ornithology to form the Max Planck Institute for Biological Intelligence, 01.01.2023)
 Max Planck Institute for Ornithology (merged with the Max Planck Institute of Neurobiology to form the Max Planck Institute for Biological Intelligence, 01.01.2023)

See also 
 List of institutes and centers of the National Institutes of Health
 Center of Advanced European Studies and Research
 Ernst Strüngmann Institute
 List of IBS Centers

References

 
Max Planck